ADBICA (also known as ADB-PICA) is a designer drug identified in synthetic cannabis blends in Japan in 2013. ADBICA had not previously been reported in the scientific literature prior to its sale as a component of synthetic cannabis blends. ADBICA features a carboxamide group at the 3-indole position, like SDB-001 and STS-135. The stereochemistry of the tert-butyl side-chain in the product is unresolved, though in a large series of indazole derivatives structurally similar to ADBICA that are disclosed in Pfizer patent WO 2009/106980, activity resides exclusively in the (S) enantiomers. ADBICA is a potent agonist of the CB1 receptor and CB2 receptor with an EC50 value of 0.69 nM and 1.8 nM respectively.

Legal Status

As of October 2015 ADBICA is a controlled substance in China.

See also 

 5F-AB-PINACA
 5F-ADB
 5F-ADBICA
 5F-AMB
 5F-APINACA
 AB-FUBINACA
 AB-CHFUPYCA
 AB-CHMINACA
 AB-PINACA
 ADB-CHMINACA
 ADB-FUBINACA
 ADB-PINACA
 ADB-P7AICA
 APICA
 APINACA
 MDMB-CHMICA
 PF-03550096
 STS-135
 PX-3

References 

Cannabinoids
Designer drugs
Indolecarboxamides
Tert-butyl compounds